The Rough Fire was a wildfire of the 2015 California season. It burned  of land, a season record, and was extinguished by 3,742 firefighters.

Progression
The fire, caused by a lightning strike on July 31, approximately  North of Hume Lake, burned mainly in the Sierra National Forest and Sequoia National Forest.

On September 2, over 2,500 people were safely evacuated from Hume Lake Christian Camps and surrounding area. All camp events were cancelled and only security personnel remained.

On September 5, the fire reached Kings Canyon National Park as it crossed the  mark.

On September 7, a severely burned firefighter was airlifted to the Community Regional Medical Center in Fresno.

On September 10, officials at Kings Canyon National Park began evacuating all visitors and employees from the Wilsonia and General Grant Grove areas. A mandatory evacuation order was issued for Dunlap, effective September 11.

On September 11, Fresno health officials reported an unprecedented increase in hospital emergency department visits due to respiratory problems, and urged residents to avoid outdoor activities when the air is smoky.

On September 15, as the fire slowed and with favorable weather conditions, evacuation orders and warnings in Dunlap and Squaw Valley were lifted. By that time, 3,742 firefighters, 345 engines, 19 helicopters and 45 bulldozers had been deployed.

As of November 5, the Rough Fire is 100% contained.

Area by ownership
, the total burned area breaks down into:

References

2015 California wildfires
Sierra National Forest
Wildfires in Fresno County, California